Donald Lindsay Mathieson  is a New Zealand lawyer and lay Anglican.

Biography
From 1940 to 1953, Mathieson was educated at Nelson College, where he was a prefect and dux in his final year, and a member of the school's 1st XI hockey team for three years. He then studied at Victoria University College, graduating BA LLB in 1959. While at Victoria, he also played chess and hockey, before winning a Rhodes Scholarship in 1959 to University College, Oxford.

In addition to spending more than 40 years in private practice, Mathieson was Crown Counsel in the Crown Law Office. From 2010 to 2015 he was President of the Film and Literature Board of Review.

In the 2012 New Year Honours, Mathieson was appointed an Officer of the New Zealand Order of Merit, for services to the law and legal education.

Mathieson, an active lay Anglican, edited  Faith at work in 2001, 'arguing that  Christians should practise their faith at work.' He wrote on the subject of same-sex marriage, in context of the Anglican church adapting to the Marriage (Definition of Marriage) Amendment Act 2013:
It is time to speak forthrightly in support of the clear scriptural witness about the sinfulness of homosexual acts and the position adopted without dissension by Roman Catholic, Protestant and Eastern Orthodox Churches alike for nearly two thousand years.

Significant and dissenting decisions 
 L.A. Zombie [2011] NZFLBR 2 (7 June 2011)
 Into the River by Ted Dawe [2013] NZFLBR 1 (17 December 2013)

Works

References 

Year of birth missing (living people)
Living people
People educated at Nelson College
Victoria University of Wellington alumni
Alumni of University College, Oxford
20th-century New Zealand lawyers
New Zealand King's Counsel
New Zealand Rhodes Scholars
New Zealand Anglicans
Officers of the New Zealand Order of Merit